Leo Ensio Linkovesi (8 April 1947 – 7 November 2006) was a Finnish speedskater who specialised on the shorter distances, the 500 m and the 1000 m.

Linkovesi was born in Helsinki, Finland. He won the first ever official World Sprint Speed Skating Championships in 1972. In January of that year in Davos, he also set world records on the 500 m with 38.0 and in the sprint combination with 156.500 (38.7 – 1:19.3 / 38.0 – 1:20.3). Remarkably, three other skaters (Hasse Börjes, Erhard Keller, and Lasse Efskind) equalled the 38.0 world record time before it was lowered by Yevgeny Kulikov to 37.99 in 1975. At the 1972 Winter Olympics, Linkovesi placed sixth on the 500 m. Linkovesi died in Kerava, Finland at the age of 59.

World records

References

External links
 
 
 
 

1947 births
2006 deaths
Finnish male speed skaters
Olympic speed skaters of Finland
Speed skaters at the 1972 Winter Olympics
World record setters in speed skating
World Sprint Speed Skating Championships medalists
Sportspeople from Helsinki